Cranbrook Castle is an Iron Age Hill fort occupying a commanding hilltop just to the south of and overlooking the Teign valley in Devon. It is 337 metres above sea level and 2 km south and slightly west of Prestonbury Castle, 3 km west of Wooston Castle.

References

Hill forts in Devon
Moretonhampstead